Paul Joseph Dennis Hodgson (born April 14, 1960) is a Canadian-born former Major League Baseball outfielder.

After being signed on his 17th birthday by the Toronto Blue Jays as an amateur free agent in 1977, he played his entire career in their organization, appearing in 20 games in the major leagues in 1980 at the age of 20, and after three more seasons in the minors his professional baseball career was over at the age of 23.

External links

1960 births
Anglophone Quebec people
Baseball people from Quebec
Canadian expatriate baseball players in the United States
Major League Baseball outfielders
Toronto Blue Jays players
Utica Blue Jays players
Medicine Hat Blue Jays players
Dunedin Blue Jays players
Kinston Eagles players
Knoxville Blue Jays players
Major League Baseball players from Canada
Living people
Baseball players from Montreal